Tom Peckham (born December 28, 1943) is an American wrestler. He competed in the men's freestyle 87 kg at the 1968 Summer Olympics.

References

1943 births
Living people
American male sport wrestlers
Olympic wrestlers of the United States
Wrestlers at the 1968 Summer Olympics
People from Cresco, Iowa
Sportspeople from Iowa